Prilep is a municipality in the south of North Macedonia. Prilep is also the name of the city where the municipal seat is found. It is located in the Pelagonia Statistical Region.

Geography
The municipality borders Čaška and Dolneni municipalities to the north, Kavadarci Municipality to the east, Krivogaštani, Mogila and Novaci municipalities to the west, and Greece to the south.

The municipality spreads over the northeastern part of the Pelagonia valley, it takes contains much of the Mariovo region.

Demographics
The population of the municipality is 69,025.  According to the last national Macedonian census from 2021 the majority in the municipality is represented by the ethnic Macedonians.

Inhabited places
The number of the inhabited places in the municipality is 59. There are one city and 58 villages. Many villages have small populations or are even abandoned.

References

External links
 Official website

 
Pelagonia Statistical Region
Municipalities of North Macedonia
Romani communities in North Macedonia